MPDS or Mobile Packet Data Service provides remote users  with IP capability over satellite for portable and extremely reliable communications for Internet applications such as World Wide Web access, file transfer and e-mail. It was launched by COMSAT mobile communications (CMC).

Mobile telecommunications